Cəngan is a village and municipality in the Sabirabad Rayon of Azerbaijan.

Populated places in Sabirabad District